Berdavan is a town in the Tavush Province of Armenia.

See also
 Tavush Province

References 

World Gazeteer: Armenia – World-Gazetteer.com

Populated places in Tavush Province